Gila Box Riparian National Conservation Area is a National Conservation Area located along the Gila River in southern Graham and Greenlee counties in southeastern Arizona in the United States. Campgrounds and hiking trails are available. The section of the Gila River that flows through the Gila Box is popular with white-water rafters and kayakers.

The Gila Box Riparian National Conservation Area is located 20 miles northeast of Safford, Arizona in Graham and Greenlee Counties.

External links
 Official Gila Box Riparian National Conservation Area website
 

Gila River
National Conservation Areas of the United States
Nature reserves in Arizona
Protected areas of Graham County, Arizona
Protected areas of Greenlee County, Arizona
Protected areas of the Sonoran Desert
Units of the National Landscape Conservation System
Protected areas established in 1990
1990 establishments in Arizona